Dorstenia appendiculata is a species of subshrub or herb in the plant family Moraceae which is native to eastern Brazil.

References

appendiculata
Plants described in 1853
Flora of Brazil